Cantone may refer to:

Places 
 Cantons of Switzerland, known in Italian as cantone
 Cantone, Poschiavo, a locality in Poschiavo, Switzerland
 Cantone, Introdacqua, a subdivision of Introdacqua, Abruzzo, Italy
 Cantone, Nerviano, a subdivision of Nerviano, Lombardy, Italy
 Cantone, Stagno Lombardo, a subdivision of Stagno Lombardo, Lombardy, Italy
 Cantone, Gattatico, a subdivision of Gattatico, Reggio Emilia, Italy
 Cantone, Pieve di Cento, a subdivision of Pieve di Cento, Reggio Emilia, Italy
 Cantone, Parrano, a subdivision of Parrano, Ubmria, Italy

People 
 Mario Cantone (born 1959), American comedian, writer and actor
 Luigi Cantone (1917–1997), Italian fencer
 Oberto Cantone (16th century), Italian mathematician
 Raffaele Cantone (born 1963), Italian magistrate
 Tiziana Cantone (1983–2016), Italian victim of cyberbullying

See also 
 Canton (disambiguation)
 Cantona (disambiguation)
 Cantoni, a surname